Terrance Joseph Broadway (born April 16, 1992) is an American football quarterback. He was the Louisiana-Lafayette Ragin' Cajuns starting quarterback from 2012 to 2014. During his tenure, Broadway led the Cajuns to 3 bowl victories while collecting two bowl MVP's.

Early years
Broadway attended Capitol High School in Baton Rouge, Louisiana. He was ranked the fifth best dual threat quarterback by Rivals.com for the Class of 2010.

College career
Broadway played the 2010 NCAA Division I FBS football season as a freshman with the Houston Cougars football team, where he substituted for starting quarterback, Case Keenum, in four regular season games. His first career game was played on September 18, 2010, where he recorded 84 yards and one touchdown. He finished the season with 424 yards and three touchdowns.

In the spring semester of 2011, he transferred from the University of Houston to the University of Louisiana at Lafayette. In 2013, Broadway became one of 34 quarterbacks on the Davey O'Brien Award watch list.

In his final collegiate game, Broadway was the MVP of the 2014 New Orleans Bowl.

References 

1992 births
Living people
American football quarterbacks
Houston Cougars football players
Louisiana Ragin' Cajuns football players
Players of American football from Baton Rouge, Louisiana